Pocitos is an inhabited place in the state of Aguascalientes. It is located 3 miles northwest of the city of Aguascalientes and has a population of 5,169.

External links

References

Populated places in Aguascalientes